Carol Nolan (born 23 May 1978) is an Irish Independent politician who has been a Teachta Dála (TD) for the Laois–Offaly constituency since the 2020 general election, and previously from 2016 to 2020 for the Offaly constituency.

Early and personal life
Nolan was born in Tullamore in 1978, but she is a native of Cadamstown, County Offaly. Nolan was educated at Mary Immaculate College and NUI Galway. She was a primary school teacher for 12 years. Nolan was also principal of Gaelscoil Thromaire in County Laois for three years.

Political career
Before becoming a TD, she was a Sinn Féin member of Offaly County Council from 2014 to 2016, for the Birr local electoral ward.

In March 2018, she was suspended from Sinn Féin for three months for voting against legislation to allow for a referendum on the repeal of the Eighth Amendment to the Constitution, support for which had been adopted at the party's Ard Fheis.

She endorsed the Cherish all the Children Equally campaign which advocated for a No vote in the 2018 abortion referendum. She campaigned for the Love Both campaign which also advocated for a No vote in the referendum.

She resigned from Sinn Féin on 19 June 2018, over the party's stance on abortion, saying "“I won’t be supporting the legislation as my position remains the same, as a pro-life TD who is strongly opposed to abortion".

She was re-elected as an Independent TD for the Laois–Offaly constituency following the 2020 general election. Nolan is a member of the Rural Group of Independent TDs in the 33rd Dail.

References

External links

1978 births
Living people
Alumni of Mary Immaculate College, Limerick
Alumni of the University of Galway
Independent TDs
Irish anti-abortion activists
Irish schoolteachers
Local councillors in County Offaly
Members of the 32nd Dáil
Members of the 33rd Dáil
People from Birr, County Offaly
Sinn Féin TDs (post-1923)
21st-century women Teachtaí Dála
Women heads of schools in Ireland